The Miami Beach Police Department is the police department of the U.S. city of Miami Beach, Florida, patrolling the entire Miami Beach area, although they sometimes cooperate with the county-wide Miami-Dade Police Department.

The Miami Beach Police are famous for their bicycle patrols, which wear dark blue shorts and white short-sleeve uniform tops. The bicycle patrols were created due to the frequent traffic congestion of the Miami Beach isles (particularly in the famous Ocean Drive area on South Beach). Bicycle patrols go where patrol vehicles cannot, but they also perform traffic duties. There are even some patrol officers on roller skates.

The Miami Beach Police wear dark blue trousers with dark blue shirts, and have red, white, and blue patrol vehicles however, the department is in the process of switching over to black and white patrol vehicles by the end of 2008. The current Chief of the Department is Chief Richard Clements.

Incidents
In recent years, the Miami Beach Police Department has come under scrutiny for their involvement in a series of questionable incidents. In 2009, two officers were accused of taunting and falsely arresting a gay man. In another incident, one of their officers was arrested on felony charges for a crash in an all-terrain vehicle, seriously injuring and hospitalizing two people. The arrested officer and a second officer had been drinking on-duty with a group of women who were having a bachelorette party at a local nightspot prior to the crash. In another incident, officers fired approximately 100 shots at a motorist during a busy Urban Weekend celebration surrounding Memorial Day; numerous innocent bystanders were injured by police bullets. After several years of scrutiny, the investigation remains open. 

In August 2013, a teenage graffiti artist was chased by police after being observed tagging an abandoned building. The teenager subsequently died after being shot with a taser. His family has filed a lawsuit against the city of Miami Beach. 

In July 2021, five officers assaulted Dalonta Crudup and two bystanders filming the incident. The officers were charged with first-degree misdemeanor battery.

Firearms 
In 2020, the Miami Beach Police adopted the Brügger & Thomet APC variant, APC9K PRO, which includes the lower receiver to accept SIG Sauer P320 9mm magazines. Beginning in the 1980s, MBPD transitioned to the SIG Sauer P226. In 2012, the department adopted the Smith & Wesson M&P .40S&W, which is currently being replaced by the SIG Sauer P320 X-CARRY PRO in 9mm as of 2021. The P320 X-CARRY was chosen as the department's new duty sidearm after competing with the Beretta APX, Glock 19, SIG Sauer P226, and Smith & Wesson M&P9 M2.0. The department also evaluated and is adopting the SIG Sauer P365 for concealed carry and/or off-duty sidearm roles.

Gallery

References

Government of Miami Beach, Florida
Municipal police departments of Florida